Edmond Dubrunfaut (1920, Denain – 2007) was a Belgian painter.

1920 births
2007 deaths
People from Denain
20th-century Belgian painters